PLIF may refer to:

 Planar laser-induced fluorescence, an optical diagnostic technique
 Posterior lumbar interbody fusion, a type of spinal fusion
 Plif, a character on the TV series Plonsters
 Plif, a Hoojib character in the Star Wars universe